Per Brandt (born 30 October 1972) is a Swedish biathlete. He competed in the men's 20 km individual event at the 1994 Winter Olympics.

References

1972 births
Living people
Swedish male biathletes
Olympic biathletes of Sweden
Biathletes at the 1994 Winter Olympics
People from Vansbro Municipality
20th-century Swedish people